Kingdom of Italy in a modern context usually refers to the predecessor state of the Italian Republic, 1861–1946.

Kingdom of Italy may also refer to:
Kingdom of Rome (753–509 BCE)
Kingdom of Italy (476–493)
Ostrogothic Kingdom (493–553), also Regnum Italiae
Kingdom of the Lombards (568–774), also Regnum totius Italiae
Duchy of Rome (late 7th century – 756)
Kingdom of Italy (Holy Roman Empire) (855–1801), also Regnum Italiae or Regnum Italicum
Kingdom of Italy (Napoleonic) (1805–1814)

See also
King of Italy
History of Italy
List of historic states of Italy